The IMT Des Moines Marathon is a marathon held annually in downtown Des Moines, Iowa. It serves as a qualifier for the Boston Marathon.

Race weekend features the Mercy Live Up Loop 5-Mile Run & 1-Mile Walk and Mercy Children's Hospital & Clinics 1-Mile Youth Run and Jingle Jog on Saturday followed by the IMT Des Moines Marathon & Half Marathon, Bankers Trust Marathon Relay and Principal 5K Road Race on Sunday.

All races start and finish in the heart of downtown Des Moines and feature scenic courses boasting the Des Moines skyline, city parks and residential neighborhoods.

"The IMT Des Moines Marathon is all about community; the community of volunteers, race committee, and the great city of Des Moines that embraces this awesome event. The IMT Des Moines Marathon is a perfect size event with 9,000 runners. Large enough that you have plenty of runners to run with but small enough that you feel like you're part of the IMT Des Moines Marathon family," said Bart Yasso, Runner's World Chief Running Officer.

The first running of the marathon was held in 2002. More than 9,000 athletes participated in the 2013 races.

The marathon was cancelled in 2020 due to the COVID-19 pandemic. In 2021, the race celebrated its 20th Anniversary with IMT DSM Marathon designed medals.

Men's winners

Women's winners

References

External links
Official website
Facebook Page
Twitter Handle
YouTube Channel

Marathons in the United States
2002 establishments in Iowa